The Geelong Cricket Club was originally formed as a Sub-District side to keep the ‘VCA fires burning’, entering the VSDCA in 1964/65, before making its debut as an amalgamated side with North Melbourne Cricket Club in 1985/86.  This joint venture lasted for three seasons before disbanding, with North Melbourne continuing in the association on its own.

Geelong was re-admitted as a single entity prior to the 1993/94 season with Michael King as Club President, and former North Melbourne, St. Kilda, South Melbourne and Victorian Shield representative Peter Cox as the Inaugural First XI Captain.

The club originally used the St. Mary's Football Club rooms as its headquarters during the season before the move to the current location on Geelong Cricket Ground in January 1996.  The City of Greater Geelong and Geelong Football Club played a major role in developing the club to what it is today after the move off Kardinia Park, with the building of the Ford Stand with seats facing the Geelong Cricket Ground. The two clubs still have a strong working relationship from which both parties benefit. Throughout this time, St. Mary's Football Club (West Kardinia Oval) has continued to be the venue for the club's third and fourth XI matches.

As the Pathway to the Baggy Green eight players have been chosen to represent Victoria since the club's inception. Jason Bakker, Clinton Peake, Kevin Neville, Brad Stacey, Daniel Lowery, Ben Oliver, Grant Lindsay, Aaron Finch & Jake K Reed have all played at the highest level, while many others have achieved state and national representation in junior and invitational XI's. 

Aaron Finch, of course winning a national Baggy Yellow with his selection in 2010/11 in the Australian T20 team and Australian One Day Side. And his Baggy Green in October 2018 for making his debut in the Australian Test Team 

Season 2009/10 was highlighted by the First XI winning the Club's first silverware at that level when we accounted for St.Kilda Cricket Club in the final of the Kookaburra Cup T20 series which was played at the Junction Oval.

After 18 years of Premier (VCA) Cricket season 2010/11 proved a break-through year with the Club winning its first JA Seitz Trophy as the Club Champion. The recently completed season also saw the Club have all its four teams participating in finals for the second consecutive season.

The Second XI won a sixth premiership in 2011/12 bringing the club tally to 11 two-day premierships, three 3rd XI and two 4th XI.

The Geelong Cricket Club's momentum has been  building and all that is missing is the much coveted First XI flag to adorn the Bruce Moore Room.

 The club is yet to win a premiership; their best effort was runner-up to Ringwood Cricket Club in 2007–08.

References

External links

YouTube Channel
Facebook Page

Victorian Premier Cricket clubs
Sport in Geelong
1964 establishments in Australia
Cricket clubs established in 1964